Pierre Renart (born 1990, in the Pyrenees region) is a French designer and cabinetmaker, who studied carpentry at the École Boulle in Paris. Among his best-known designs are the Genesis and Ribbon Collections.

Background 
Pierre Renart studied Seat Carpentry at the École Boulle School in Paris. In June 2011, he graduated from the school with a perfect score (20/20) and with praises from the jury, after proposing his final year project: a carbon fibre and leather chair inspired an Art Deco armchair created in 1933 by Raymond Gillet.

In 2019,   Renart's furniture joined the permanent collection of the Museum of Decorative Arts in Paris.

Career 
Represented by the Maison Parisienne gallery in Paris since 2011, Renart has  presented his work in exhibitions, private hotels and other  settings in Paris, London, Brussels, Gstaad, Dubai, and New York.

In 2018, Renart started adapting his techniques to commissioned projects, creating numerous sculpted wood furniture for hotel lobbies, companies or private properties

Public collections 

 Museum of Decorative Arts, Paris (France)

Collaborations 

 22 Bishopsgate – London, U.K. Creation of XXL furniture for the lobby.
 Christian Dior – Boston, U.S.  Creation of a silver möbius console
 Studio Harcourt – Paris, France Creation of the Café Harcourt’s furniture

Exhibitions 

 Art Elysées - Galerie Maison Parisienne - Paris - October 2019
 Effets Matières - Plaza Athénée - Paris - May 2019
 Révélations - Biennale internationale métiers d’art & création - Grand Palais - Paris - May 2019
 La Promenade du Collectionneur 2 - Hôtel Le Meurice - Paris - April 2019
 PAD Paris - Jardin des Tuileries - Paris - April 2019
 Collect - Saatchi Gallery, Galerie Maison Parisienne - London - February 2019
 Art Elysées - Galerie Maison Parisienne - Paris - October 2018
 Brown’s Hotel - Galerie Maison Parisienne - London - October 2018
 La Promenade du Collectionneur - Hôtel Le Meurice - Paris - April 2018
 Art Paris - Grand Palais, Galerie Maison Parisienne - Paris - April 2018
 Collect - Saatchi Gallery, Galerie Maison Parisienne - London - February 2018
 What’s New? What’s New? - The New York Design Center - New York - September 2017
 Révélations - Biennale internationale métiers d’art & création - Grand Palais - Paris - February 2017
 Design Week Milan - Pisa Orologeria, Maison Parisienne/Côté France - April 2017
 Design Days DubaÏ - Maison Parisienne/Territoire(s) Dubaï - Dubaï - March 2017
 Collect - Saatchi Gallery, Galerie Maison Parisienne - London - February 2017
 Suite Harcourt- Hôtel de Paris - Monaco - December 2016
De Mains de Maîtres - L’ARBED - Luxembourg - December 2016
 Création du mobilier Harcourt pour le café du Studio Harcourt - Paris - May 2016
 Etoiles Filantes - Maison Parisienne/Plaza Athénée - Paris - April 2016
 Oh My Cabinet! - Maison Parisienne/Maison Assouline - London - October 2015
 Une cerise dans la voiture! - Maison Parisienne - Brussels - September 2015
 L’envers du décor - Maison Parisienne/Ancienne Nonciature – Brussels - April 2015
 Alchemic Ceremony - Maison Parisienne/Ely House Mallett – London - October 2014
 Création-innovation - L’Ecole Boulle au Musée des arts et métiers - Paris - July 2014
 Éclat d’âme - Maison Parisienne/Ancienne Nonciature - Brussels - April 2014
 Galerie Menus Plaisirs - Gstaad - December 2013
Rouge Plaza - Maison Parisienne/Studio Harcourt - Paris - December 2013
 Objets de désir - Maison Parisienne/Ancienne Nonciature – Brussels - November 2013
 Humeur Baroque - Maison Parisienne - Brussels - April 2013
 Sympathie - Kyoto - February 2013
 Rencontre - Parc floral de Paris - Paris - November 2012
 Précieuse Idylle - Maison Parisienne/Plaza Athenée - Paris - November 2012
 Rouge - Maison Particulière - Brussels - September 2012
 Chassés-croisés - Maison Parisienne/Hôtel Wielemans - Brussels - April 2012
 Hauts talents - Maison Parisienne/Salons privés Maison Christofle - Paris - March 2012
 Fêtes Galantes - Maison Parisienne/Plaza Athénée - Paris - November 2011

References 

1990 births
Living people
French cabinetmakers
French furniture designers